Lesotho elects a legislature on the national level. The Parliament has two chambers: the National Assembly with 120 members, elected for a five-year term by Mixed Member Proportional Representation, 80 of which in single-seat constituencies; and the Senate, with 33 nominated members.

Previous elections
1970 Lesotho general election
1985 Lesotho general election
1993 Lesotho general election
1998 Lesotho general election
2002 Lesotho general election
2007 Lesotho general election
2012 Lesotho general election
2015 Lesotho general election
2017 Lesotho general election

Latest election

See also
 Electoral calendar
 Electoral system

References

External links
Adam Carr's Election Archive
African Elections Database